Here's Patsy Cline is the third compilation album of music originally recorded by American country artist, Patsy Cline. The album consists of selected material Cline had recorded during her years at Four Star Records.

Background 
Here's Patsy Cline contains ten tracks Patsy Cline had recorded at Four Star Records between May 23, 1957 and January 27, 1960. Included on the first side of the recorded is an alternate version of "Yes, I Understand," as the original version had included Cline singing harmony on her lead vocals. Cover versions of "Stop the World (And Let Me Off)," "Life's Railway to Heaven," and "Just Out of Reach." The second side contained Cline's 1956 single, "I've Loved and Lost Again," as well as an alternate take of "How Can I Face Tomorrow," which also had originally included harmony.

Here's Patsy Cline has been reissued several times. In 1973, the album was reissued as a vinyl record on MCA/Coral Records, and then was then re-released in 1983 only on MCA. In 1988, the album was digitally remastered on a compact disc, also on MCA Records. The album was reviewed by Allmusic and was given three out of five stars. The release did not chart on any Billboard Magazine charts.

Track listing

Personnel 
 Anita Kerr Singers – background vocals
 Harold Bradley – bass guitar, electric guitar
 Patsy Cline – lead vocals
 Farris Coursey – drums
 Floyd Cramer – piano
 Jimmy Day – steel guitar
 Grady Martin – guitar, rhythm guitar
 Bob Moore – acoustic bass
 W.S. Stevenson – arranger

Technical 
 Milan Bogdan – mastering, remastering
 Owen Bradley – producer
 Jim Lloyd – mastering, remastering
 Glenn Meadows – mastering, remastering
 Benny Quinn – mastering, remastering
 Don Roy – liner notes

References 

Patsy Cline albums
1965 compilation albums
MCA Records compilation albums
Vocalion Records compilation albums
Albums produced by Owen Bradley